Murder In the Fleet is a 1935 American murder mystery/comedy-drama film set aboard . Released by Metro-Goldwyn-Mayer, the film was directed by Edward Sedgwick and stars Robert Taylor and Jean Parker.

Plot
Captain John Winslow (Arthur Byron) is notified by the Secretary of the Navy that his cruiser will be receiving a new firing control gear manufactured by World Electric company, which is supposed to revolutionize naval warfare. The gear vanishes and is quickly located by intelligence officers where it is being transported across the Mexican border.

When the gear is returned to the ship the secrecy surrounding the events catches the notice of reporter Walter Drake (J. Anthony Hughes). Lieutenant Tom Randolph (Robert Taylor) and Captain Winslow welcome visitors Al Duval (Raymond Hatton), who works for  World Electric Company, and Victor Hanson (Jean Hersholt) from the Navy Department, aboard while the gear is installed. Meanwhile, Sailor Spud Burke (Nat Pendleton) gets caught between his sweetheart Toots Timmons (Una Merkel)  and an old flame Betty Lansing (Jean Parker).

When the new gear is being lifted into place a cable breaks and it is dropped, later this is found to be an act of sabotage. To add to the confusion, Al Duval is murdered during a gun salute. The investigation begins and suspicions are running high when a second murder takes place, this time it is the chief electrician.

The Captain devises a plot to trap the murderer and the trail soon leads to the powder magazine, where Victor Hanson threatens to blow up the ship. Hanson claims that World Electric Company had stolen the idea and he wants revenge. Ultimately Hanson is captured and the gear is installed.

Cast
 Robert Taylor as Lt. Tom 'Tommy' Randolph
 Jean Parker as Betty Lansing
 Ted Healy as Gabby' Mac ONeill
 Una Merkel as 'Toots' Timmons
 Nat Pendleton as 'Spud' Burke
 Jean Hersholt as Victor Hanson
 Arthur Byron as Capt. John Winslow
 Frank Shields as Lt. Arnold
 Donald Cook as Lt. Cmdr. David Tucker
 Mischa Auer as Kamchukan consul (uncredited)
 Ward Bond as 'Heavy' Johnson (uncredited)
 Phyllis Crane as (uncredited)
 Mary Doran as Jenny Lane (uncredited)
 Tom Dugan as 'Greasy' (uncredited)
 Fred Graham as Crewman (uncredited)
 Roger Gray as Yard Master (uncredited)
 Raymond Hatton as Mr. Al Duval (uncredited)
 Robert Livingston as Spencer - Ship's Doctor (uncredited)
 Keye Luke as Consul's Secretary (uncredited)
 George Magrill as Sailor on Watch (uncredited)
 J.P. McGowan as Chief of Police (uncredited)
 Leila McIntyre as Mrs. Justin (uncredited)
 Edward Norris as Sleepy - Sailor (uncredited)
 Lee Phelps as Officer Berating Guard (uncredited)
 Syd Saylor as Chief Petty Officer (uncredited)
 Richard Tucker as Harry Jeffries (uncredited)
 Charles C. Wilson as Cmdr. Brown (uncredited)

Crew
 George B. Seitz - Second Unit Director (uncredited)
 Al Shenberg - Assistant Director (uncredited)
 Cedric Gibbons – Art Director
 David Townsend – Associate Art Director
 Edwin B. Willis – Associate Art Director
 Edward Ward - composer: stock music (uncredited)
 Douglas Shearer – Recording Director
 Fred Gabourie – Set Designer (uncredited)

Box office
According to MGM records the film earned $345,000 in the US and Canada and $285,000 elsewhere resulting in a profit of $216,000.

References

External links
 
 

1935 films
1930s mystery comedy-drama films
American mystery comedy-drama films
American black-and-white films
Films directed by Edward Sedgwick
Metro-Goldwyn-Mayer films
Military humor in film
1930s English-language films
1930s American films